Qingyan is a town in Huaxi, Guiyang, Guizhou, China.

Qingyan, Qing-Yan, or, variation, may also refer to:

People

Given name "Qingyan", "Qing-yan"
 Qingyan "Yan" Chen, Chinese-Hongkonger-American engineer
 Chén Qìngyán (born 1940), Singaporean politician
 Liu Qingyan, winner of the 2013 chiildren's show host award at the 48th Golden Bell Awards
 Wu Qingyan, Chinese politician at the 11th National People's Congress of China; see List of members of the 11th National People's Congress
 Yang Qingyan, 1667 builder of Jin Garden

Given name "Qing" surnamed "Yan"
Fictional characters
Yan Qing (western name order: Qing Yan), a fictional character in Water Margin

Places
 Qing Yan Garden, a classical garden in Huai'an City, Jiangsu Province, China
 Tianzi Mountain (also known as "Qingyan Mountain"), a mountain in Zhangjiajie, Hunan, China
 Qingyan Village, Shimashan Town, Lianyuan, Loudi City, Hunan Province, China
 Qingyan Subdistrict, Rong County, Zigong, Sichuan, China; see List of township-level divisions of Sichuan

Other uses

 Qing Yan Fang, a stone boat at the Summer Palace, Beijing, China

See also

 The Legend of Qing Yan, a 2021 teledrama; see List of Kuaishou original programming
 Yanqing (disambiguation), including "Yan Qing"
 Qing (disambiguation)
 Yan (disambiguation)